Dark Side, Light Side is an album by pianist George Cables recorded in 1996 and released on the Danish label, SteepleChase.

Reception 

Ken Dryden of AllMusic stated "This is another fine recording from George Cables' productive association with Steeplechase".

Track listing 
 "Dolphin Dance" (Herbie Hancock) – 9:40
 "Dark Side, Light Side" (George Cables) – 9:15
 "Ruby, My Dear" (Thelonious Monk) – 7:37
 "Alone Together" (Arthur Schwartz, Howard Dietz) – 7:25
 "In a Sentimental Mood" (Duke Ellington) – 10:26
 "One Finger Snap" (Hancock) – 5:12
 "Sweet Rita Suite Part 1" (George Cables) – 7:10
 "Ah George, We Hardly Knew You" (Don Pullen) – 8:31

Personnel 
George Cables – piano
Jay Anderson – bass
Billy Hart – drums

References 

George Cables albums
1997 albums
SteepleChase Records albums